The French pavilion houses France's national representation during the Venice Biennale arts festivals.

Background 
The Venice Biennale is an international art biennial exhibition held in Venice, Italy. Often described as "the Olympics of the art world", the Biennale is a prestigious event for contemporary artists known for propelling career visibility. The festival has become a constellation of shows: a central exhibition curated by that year's artistic director, national pavilions hosted by individual nations, and independent exhibitions throughout Venice. The Biennale parent organization also hosts regular festivals in other arts: architecture, dance, film, music, and theater.

Outside of the central, international exhibition, individual nations produce their own shows, known as pavilions, as their national representation. Nations that own their pavilion buildings, such as the 30 housed on the Giardini, are responsible for their own upkeep and construction costs as well. Nations without dedicated buildings create pavilions in venues throughout the city.

Organization and building 

The pavilion was built in 1912 and designed by architect Faust Finzi, chief engineer for the Venice municipality. Its layout and details are similar to that of the German pavilion, whose architect was Finzi's former boss.

Representation by year

Art 

 1962 — Alfred Manessier, Jean Messagier, Serge Poliakoff, André Marfaing, James Guitet
 1976 — Herve Fisher, Fred Forest, Raymond Hains, Alain Jacquet, Bertrand Lavier, Jean-Pierre Raynaud, Jean-Michel Sanejouand, Jean-Paul Thenot (Commissioner: Pierre Restany)
 1982 — Simon Hantaï
 1984 — Jean Dubuffet
 1986 — Daniel Buren
 1991 — Jean Nouvel, Christian de Portzamparc, Philippe Starck
 1993 — Jean-Pierre Raynaud
 1995 — César
 1997 — Fabrice Hybert
 1999 — Huang Yong Ping, Jean-Pierre Bertrand
 2001 — Pierre Huyghe
 2003 — Jean-Marc Bustamante (Curators: Jean-Pierre Criqui, Alfred Pacquement)
 2005 — Annette Messager (Curator: Caroline Ferreira)
 2007 — Sophie Calle (Curator: Daniel Buren)
 2009 — Claude Lévêque (Curator: Christian Bernard)
 2011 — Christian Boltanski (Curator: Jean-Hubert Martin)
 2013 — Anri Sala (Curator: Christine Macel) [Exhibition was held at the German pavilion]
 2015 — Céleste Boursier-Mougenot, Lili Reynaud-Dewar (Curator: Emma Lavigne)
 2017 — Xavier Veilhan (Curators: Lionel Bovier, Christian Marclay)
 2019 — Laure Prouvost (Curator: Martha Kirszenbaum)
 2021 — Zineb Sedira
 2024 — Julien Creuzet

References

Bibliography

Further reading 

 
 

National pavilions
French contemporary art